Magnolia ovoidea is a species of flowering plant in the family Magnoliaceae. It is endemic to China. There are only four small subpopulations of this critically endangered species.

This is a forest tree growing up to 10 meters tall. The leathery leaves are up to 14 centimeters long. The flower has eleven leathery tepals. They are yellow-green in color, the innermost taking a purple tinge.

References

ovoidea
Endangered plants
Endemic flora of China
Taxonomy articles created by Polbot